The 2000 season was the Chicago Bears' 81st in the National Football League (NFL). The team failed to improve on their 6–10 from 1999, finishing with a 5–11 record under head coach Dick Jauron. The season saw the addition of rookie sensation Brian Urlacher who would win the NFL Defensive Rookie of the Year Award.

The Bears in 2000 played an NFL record 13 games against opponents that ended the season with a winning record, including four in their own division twice each; the Bears had a record of 4–9 against these teams.

Offseason

NFL Draft

Undrafted free agents

Staff

Roster

Regular season

Schedule

Game summaries

Week 5: at Green Bay Packers

Standings

Awards and records 
 Mike Brown, PFW/Pro Football Writers of America All-Rookie Team
 Paul Edinger, PFW/Pro Football Writers of America All-Rookie Team
 Brian Urlacher, NFC Pro Bowl Selection,
 Brian Urlacher, NFL Defensive Rookie of the Month, October
 Brian Urlacher, Associated Press Defensive Rookie of the Year 
 Brian Urlacher, Football Digest Defensive Rookie of the Year 
 Brian Urlacher, Pro Football Writers of America Defensive Rookie of the Year 
 Brian Urlacher, Sports Illustrated Rookie of the Year 
 Brian Urlacher, Sporting News Defensive Rookie of the Year 
 Brian Urlacher, USA Today Defensive Rookie of the Year 
 Brian Urlacher, PFW/Pro Football Writers of America All-Rookie Team

References 

 2000 Chicago Bears Season at www.bearshistory.com

Chicago Bears
Chicago Bears seasons
Bear
2000 in Illinois
2000s in Chicago